Gasan may refer to:

Places 
 Həsənqaydı (also spelled Gasan-Gaydi), a village in Azerbaijan
 Gasan, Marinduque, a municipality in the Philippines on the island of Marinduque
 Gasan (mountain), in South Korea 가산 (경북)
 Gasan, Gasan-dong, a dong (neighbourhood) of Geumcheon-gu in Seoul, South Korea
 Gasan Digital Complex station, a subway station in Seoul, South Korea

People 
 Gasan, also known as Gasan Jōseki (1275–1366), a Japanese Soto Zen master
 Gasan Gasanov, a Russian mixed martial artist
 Gasan Umalatov, a former Russian professional football player